The Men's points race event of the 2015 UCI Track Cycling World Championships was held on 20 February 2015.

Results
The race was started at 20:15.

160 laps (40 km) were raced with 12 sprints.

References

Men's points race
UCI Track Cycling World Championships – Men's points race